Minister for Seniors and Ageing and Minister for Volunteering are positions in the government of Western Australia, currently held by Mick Murray of the Labor Party. The position of "Minister for the Aged" was first created in 1984, for the government of Brian Burke; in 2005 a combined "Minister for Seniors and Volunteering". This arrangement was terminated in 2017 when they were made into separate portfolios. The ministers' portfolios fall within the state government's Department of Local Government and Communities.

Titles
 20 December 1984 – 27 February 1991: Minister for the Aged
 27 February 1991 – 25 November 2005: Minister for Seniors
 25 November 2005 – 17 March 2017: Minister for Seniors and Volunteering
 17 March 2017 – present: Minister for Seniors and Ageing; Minister for Volunteering

List of ministers

See also
 Minister for Child Protection (Western Australia)
 Minister for Community Services (Western Australia)
 Minister for Youth (Western Australia)

References
 David Black (2014), The Western Australian Parliamentary Handbook (Twenty-Third Edition). Perth [W.A.]: Parliament of Western Australia.

Seniors
Minister for Seniors
Volunteering in Australia